Corinne Alexandra Conley (born May 23, 1929) is an American retired actress who spent the majority of her career in Canada, notable for having won the Canadian Council of Authors and Artists' Best Actress Award. Conley is known for her voiceover work in various films and television productions and is better recognized for voicing Rudolph's mother and presumably Dolly for Sue in Rudolph the Red-Nosed Reindeer (1964).

Conley's acting career has spanned seventy years, receiving several nominations for her work. She has also made prominent and notable appearances in Tales of the Wizard of Oz as Dorothy Gale (1961), Days of Our Lives as Phyllis Anderson (1973-1982), the Goosebumps episode "Monster Blood" as Aunt Katherine (1996), Quads! as Sister Butch (2001-2002), A Christmas Horror Story as Aunt Edda (2015), and voicing multiple characters in the Watch Dogs: Legion video game (2020).

Acting career
For two years, she played the ingenue lead in The Common Glory, an outdoor drama in Williamsburg, Virginia.

For four years, Conley portrayed Phyllis Anderson on the NBC-TV daytime drama Days of Our Lives. She also provided the voice of Dolly Sue and Rudolph’s mother in the 1964 animated NBC-TV special Rudolph the Red-Nosed Reindeer.

Conley was a winner of the Canadian radio talent competition Opportunity Knocks. Beginning in 1955, she was hostess of Open House, a daily program on CBC Television. She played the female lead in CBC-TV's adaptation of the soap opera Search for Tomorrow. Other Canadian TV programs on which she appeared included Playdate, G. M. Presents, and Portrait. She also was heard on Crime Quiz on CBC Radio, and she made commercials for radio and TV.

On Broadway, Conley portrayed Pearl Vambrance in Love and Libel (1960). Her other stage experience includes productions of the National Classic Theatre (NCT) in New York, which presented plays across the United States in colleges and high schools, and The Mountain Playhouse, Beaver Lake, and Vineland Summer Theatre, all in Canada. She also performed with the comedy duo Wayne and Shuster across Canada.

In an interview with Saturday Morning Rewind in 2013, Conley admitted to having no memory of voicing Dolly for Sue during the production of Rudolph the Red-Nosed Reindeer (1964), but remembers voicing Rudolph's mother. She told the interviewer that the possibility of voicing Dolly is likely, but has no memory of it. According to several movie databases and websites, Corinne Conley is credited as Dolly for Sue and additional voices.

In 2018, Conley defended the Rudolph the Red-Nosed Reindeer TV film against claims of bigotry and bullying.

Personal life
Conley was born in New York and spent most of her youth in Radford, Virginia. After graduating from high school in Radford, she graduated from the University of Mary Washington in Virginia.

Conley married Bonar Stuart, whom she met when both worked with the NCT. They have two sons, Tony and Curtis.

Filmography
Tit Coq (1953) - Rosie
Rudolph the Red-Nosed Reindeer (1964) - Dolly for Sue and Rudolph's mother
The Return of Count Yorga (1971) - Witch
The Night God Screamed (1971) - Betty Coogan
Mark Twain and Me (1991) - Saleswoman
Final Judgment (1991) - Dr. Monroe
Search for Diana (1992) - Dr. Woodhouse
Deadly Matrimony (1992) - Genevieve Capstaff
Shattered Trust: The Shari Karney Story (1993) - Female Judge
Butterbox Babies (1995) - Mrs. Chadaway
Salt Water Moose (1996) - Grandma
Cleveland Woods Last Day on Earth (short film, 1996)
Her Desperate Choice (1996) - Jody's Mother
The Care and Handling of Roses (1996) - Margaret
The Defenders: Payback (1997) - Judge Turner
Dead Husbands (1998) - Mrs. Catcher
Custody of the Heart (2000) - Connie
Franklin and the Green Knight: The Movie (2000) - Granny Turtle (voice only)
Guilty Hearts (2002) - Mae Moran
RFK (2002) - Rose Kennedy
Christmas Rush (2002) - Gramma Pat
Big Spender (2003) - Rita
The Berenstain Bears (2003) - Grizzly Gran (voice only)
Love Rules! (2004) - Grandma Betty
Saving Emily (2004) - Grandma Wilton
Heidi (2005) - Grannie (voice only)
Franklin and the Turtle Lake Treasure (2006) - Granny Turtle (voice only)
Legacy of Fear (2006) - Mimi Wickersham
Shades of Black: The Conrad Black Story (2006) - Maud
Nature of the Beast (2007) - Lucy Sullivan
The Way It Used to Be (short film, 2009) - Rebecca
Old Stock (2012) - Gloria
Cas & Dylan (2013) - Rose
WolfCop (2014) - Mayor Bradley
A Christmas Horror Story (2015) - Aunt Edda
A Simple Favor (2018) - Librarian

References

External links 
Corinne Conley at IMDb

1929 births
American film actresses
American stage actresses
Actresses from Virginia
20th-century American actresses
Living people
American expatriates in Canada
University of Mary Washington alumni